Sea to Sky may refer to:

 Sea-to-Sky Highway, a highway in Western Canada, the portion of highway 99 from Horseshoe Bay to Pemberton
 Sea-to-Sky Corridor, the region around the Sea-to-Sky Highway which includes Whistler
 Sea to Sky University, a university in Squamish, British Columbia, Canada, opened in 2007
 Sea to Sky Transit, a division of Pacific Western Transportation, which operates service in Whistler and the Pemberton Valley area of British Columbia, Canada 
 Sea to Sky School District, a school district covering Squamish, Whistler, and Pemberton in British Columbia, Canada
 Sea to Sky (sculpture), public art at the Washington State Capitol, Olympia, Washington